The following is a partial list of the "D" codes for Medical Subject Headings (MeSH), as defined by the United States National Library of Medicine (NLM).

This list covers nerve tissue proteins. For other protein-related codes, see List of MeSH codes (D12.776).

Codes before these are found at List of MeSH codes (D12.776) § MeSH D12.776.624.776.960. Codes following these are found at List of MeSH codes (D12.776.660). For other MeSH codes, see List of MeSH codes.

The source for this content is the set of 2006 MeSH Trees from the NLM.

– nerve tissue proteins

– agrin

– chimerin proteins

– chimerin 1

– chromogranins

– dopamine and camp-regulated phosphoprotein 32

– fragile x mental retardation protein

– gap-43 protein

– glucose transporter type 3

– hu paraneoplastic encephalomyelitis antigens

– microtubule-associated proteins

– kinesin

– tau proteins

– myelin proteins

– myelin-associated glycoprotein

– myelin basic proteins
 – myelin p2 protein

– myelin p0 protein

– myelin proteolipid protein

– natriuretic peptide, brain

– nerve growth factors

– brain-derived neurotrophic factor

– ciliary neurotrophic factor

– glia maturation factor

– glial cell line-derived neurotrophic factors
 – glial cell line-derived neurotrophic factor
 – neurturin

– nerve growth factor

– neuregulins
 – neuregulin-1

– neurotrophin 3

– pituitary adenylate cyclase-activating polypeptide

– neuroendocrine secretory protein 7b2

– neurofilament proteins

– neurogranin

– neuronal apoptosis-inhibitory protein

– neuronal calcium-sensor proteins

– guanylate cyclase-activating proteins

– hippocalcin

– kv channel-interacting proteins

– neurocalcin

– recoverin

– neuropeptides

– angiotensins
 – angiotensin i
 – angiotensin ii
 – angiotensin iii

– bombesin

– bradykinin

– calcitonin

– calcitonin gene-related peptide

– carnosine

– cholecystokinin

– corticotropin

– corticotropin-releasing hormone

– delta sleep-inducing peptide

– fmrfamide

– galanin

– gastric inhibitory polypeptide

– gastrin-releasing peptide

– gastrins

– glucagon precursors
 – glucagon

– gonadorelin

– melanocyte-stimulating hormones
 – alpha-msh
 – beta-msh
 – gamma-msh

– motilin

– msh release-inhibiting hormone

– msh-releasing hormone

– neuropeptide y

– neurophysins

– neurotensin

– opioid peptides
 – dynorphins
 – endorphins
 – alpha-endorphin
 – beta-endorphin
 – gamma-endorphin
 – enkephalins
 – enkephalin, ala(2)-mephe(4)-gly(5)-
 – enkephalin, leucine
 – enkephalin, methionine
 – enkephalin, d-penicillamine (2,5)-

– pancreatic polypeptide

– peptide phi

– pituitary adenylate cyclase-activating polypeptide

– pituitary hormone release inhibiting hormones

– pituitary hormone-releasing hormones

– prolactin release-inhibiting hormone

– prolactin-releasing hormone

– secretin

– somatostatin

– somatotropin-releasing hormone

– tachykinins
 – eledoisin
 – kassinin
 – neurokinin a
 – neurokinin b
 – physalaemin
 – substance p

– thyrotropin-releasing hormone

– vasoactive intestinal peptide

– vasopressins
 – argipressin
 – lypressin
 – oxytocin
 – vasotocin

– olfactory marker protein

– s100 proteins

– leukocyte L1 antigen complex
 – calgranulin a
 – calgranulin b

– synapsins

– synaptophysin

– synucleins

– alpha-synuclein

– beta-synuclein

– gamma-synuclein

– tubulin

The list continues at List of MeSH codes (D12.776.660).

D12.776.641